Gao Mang (1926 – 6 October 2017) also known by his pen name Wulanhan, was a Chinese translator and painter who had been honored by the governments of both Russia and China.

He was one of the main translators of the works of the Russian poets Alexander Pushkin, Ivan Bunin, Mikhail Lermontov and Anna Akhmatova into Chinese. His translation of Anna Akhmatova's Requiem had won the Russian-Chinese Translator Prize in 2013.

Biography
Gao was born in Harbin, Heilongjiang in 1926, his mother was an illiterate in the old society.

Gao primarily studied at a Russian school and he was a graduate of the YMCA of Harbin.

After graduation, Gao started to publish works in 1943.

Gao worked in the Harbin Sino-Soviet Friendship Association as an editor and translator.

After the founding of the Communist State, Gao worked in Beijing Sino-Soviet Friendship Association in 1954, at the same year, he joined the China Writers Association.

In 1964, Gao was transferred to the Chinese Academy of Social Sciences, he retired in 1989.

Gao received an honorary doctorate degree from the Russian Academy of Sciences.

Works
 Russian Literature and Me
 How Long It is Since We Last Met, Moscow
 Kulimu
 Trip to Shengshan
 Essays of Russian Art
 Essays of Life
 Mohen

Translations
 Poetry of Pushkin (Alexander Pushkin)
 Desolation Angels (Jack Kerouac)
 Poetry of Lermontov (Mikhail Lermontov)
 Poetry of Bunin (Ivan Bunin)
 Poetry of Anna Akhmatova (Anna Akhmatova)
 The Bug (Vladimir Mayakovsky)
 The Bath (Vladimir Mayakovsky)
 Early life of Carl Marx

Awards
Gao was honored the Medal of the Friendship between China and Russia in 1997, he received the Medal of Friendly Relationship between China and Russia and the Medal of Friendly Relationship between Russia and China in 1999. Gao won the Russian-Chinese Translator Prize for translating Anna Akhmatova's Requiem in 2013.

References

1926 births
2017 deaths
Writers from Harbin
People's Republic of China translators
Russian–Chinese translators
Artists from Harbin
Painters from Heilongjiang
20th-century Chinese translators
21st-century Chinese translators
Recipients of the Order of Merit (Ukraine), 3rd class